October Sky EP is October Sky first studio recording, which was self-released on September 23, 2006.

The EP was recorded and engineered by Jimmy Bourgoing, and produced, mixed and mastered by the band, all at Studio Sixieme Sens in Longueuil, Quebec. The album art and design was done by Liam Oscar Thurston at TAXI Agency.

Track listing

References

External links
Official Website

2006 EPs
October Sky (band) albums